Chen Shih-hsin (born 16 November 1978) is the first Taiwanese athlete to win a gold medal at the Olympics.  She won the gold medal in the women's 49-kilogram category in taekwondo at the 2004 Summer Olympics on August 26.

Chen was recognized as one of the Taiwanese Ten Outstanding Young Persons in 2001. Currently, she is an associate professor at University of Taipei.

Chen is of Taiwanese Aboriginal descent, with her mother being a member of the Atayal tribe.

References

External links
 

1978 births
Living people
Olympic gold medalists for Taiwan
Olympic taekwondo practitioners of Taiwan
Taekwondo practitioners at the 2004 Summer Olympics
Sportspeople from Taipei
Academic staff of the University of Taipei
Asian Games medalists in taekwondo
Asian Games gold medalists for Chinese Taipei
Olympic medalists in taekwondo
Taekwondo practitioners at the 2002 Asian Games
Medalists at the 2004 Summer Olympics
Taiwanese female taekwondo practitioners
Medalists at the 2002 Asian Games
World Taekwondo Championships medalists
Atayal people
University of Taipei alumni
21st-century Taiwanese women